Saim Kokona (born 26 February 1934 in Gjirokastër, Albania) is the most prolific Albanian cinematographer in the cinema of Albania.

Kokona began working in film in 1964 on Qemal Stafa and has undertaken the cinematography of over 40 films between then and 1990, working on major Albanian films such as Brazdat (1973) and Apasionata (1983).

He retired from the industry in 1990.

Filmography
Babai i studentit (1988) 
Shpresa (1988) 
Sinjali i dashurisë (1988) 
Eja! (1987) 
Fjalë pa fund (1986) 
Mondi dhe Diana (1985) 
Të mos heshtësh (1985) 
Taulanti kërkon një motër (1984) 
Apasionata (1983) 
Dritat e qytezës (1983) 
Njeriu i mirë (1982) 
Dita e parë e emrimit (1981) 
Në prag të lirisë (1981) 
Sketerre 43 (1980) 
Balonat (1979) 
Radiostacioni (1979) 
Koncert në vitin 1936 (1978) 
Cirku në fshat (1977) 
Me studentët ushtarakë (1977) 
Shëmbja e idhujve (1977) 
Pylli i lirisë (1976) 
Beni ecën vetë (1975) 
Kursim, kursim, kursim (1975) 
Miq në festën tonë (1974) 
Shpërthimi (1974) 
Ata quheshin Arbër (1973) 
Brazdat (1973) 
Ndërgjegja (1972) 
Shkolla tingujt ngjyra (1972) 
Vështrim përmes mijëvjeçarëve (1972) 
Shkolla dhe rrugët e jetës (1971) 
Takim me artin revolucionar kinez (1971) 
Guximtarët (1970) 
Njësiti guerril (1969) 
Prita (1968) 
Në gjurmët partizane (1967) 
Ngadhnjim mbi vdekjen (1967) (known as Victory Over Death internationally)
Në rjedhën e jetës (1965) 
Takim me Arbreshët (1965) 
Qemal Stafa (1964)

External links
 

1934 births
Living people
People from Gjirokastër
Albanian cinematographers
Albanian screenwriters
Albanian artists
Albanian film directors